The U.S. Post Office and Immigration Station – Nogales Main is a historic building in Nogales, Arizona built in 1923.  It is located one block east of Nogales' main commercial street, Morely Avenue, and one block from the Santa Cruz County Courthouse.  It was listed for its architecture in the National Register of Historic Places in 1985.  Also known as Nogales Main Post Office and Immigration Station, it served historically as a post office and as a government office building.

It is designed in a simplified Classical Revival architecture style with Spanish Colonial architecture influence.  Ornamentation is limited, and mostly consists of the front entranceway's two columns and cornice.

See also 
List of United States post offices

References

External links

 

Nogales, Arizona
Buildings and structures in Santa Cruz County, Arizona
Government buildings in Arizona
Government buildings completed in 1923
National Register of Historic Places in Santa Cruz County, Arizona
Nogales
Neoclassical architecture in Arizona